United States v. Behrman, 258 U.S. 280 (1922), was a United States Supreme Court case in which the Court held that a violation of the Harrison Narcotics Act did not require a mens rea element and was thus a strict liability crime.

Background 
The defendant was a licensed physician that wrote prescriptions to Willie King for 150 grains of heroin, 360 grains of morphine, and 210 grains of cocaine as part of a maintenance treatment.  The defendant was indicted under the Harrison Act, but the district court dismissed the indictment.

Decision
The Supreme Court held that the facts were sufficient to support an indictment.  The court held that the violation of the Harrison Act was a statutory offense, and because Congress had not written in a mental state element as part of the offense that the Court should not do so.

Dissent
Justice Holmes, joined by Justices Brandeis and McReynolds, dissented, saying that if the doctor had given the prescriptions in good faith and with reasonable care that he should have a defense.

See also
List of United States Supreme Court cases, volume 258

References

External links
 

United States controlled substances case law
United States Supreme Court criminal cases
United States Supreme Court cases
United States Supreme Court cases of the Taft Court
1922 in United States case law
Pharmaceutical regulation in the United States